Electrodiffusiophoresis is a motion of particles dispersed in liquid induced by external homogeneous electric field, which makes it similar to electrophoresis.

Overview
In contradistinction with electrophoresis, motion of particle in homogeneous electric field only, electrodiffusiophoresis occurs in the areas of the dispersion that experience concentration polarization due to, for instance, electrochemical reactions, see electrochemistry. There are concentration gradients in such areas that affect particles motion strongly. First of all they create inhomogeneity in the electric field. Secondly, they cause diffusiophoresis. This peculiarities of the particles motion in the areas subjected to the concentration polarization justifies introduction of the special term for this electrokinetic effect - electrodiffusiophoresis. 

One of the most important differences of the electrodiffusioporesis from the electrophoresis is that exists as directed particles drift in the  alternating electric field. Electrophoresis, in contrary, causes only particles oscillation on the same spot. This difference opens opportunities for important applications.    

Electrodiffusiophoresis was theoretically predicted in 1980 - 82.

It was experimentally observed microscopically in 1982. 

The first application of this effect was explanation of particles depositing at some distance from the surface of the ion selective membrane.

These earlier experiments and theory were described in the review published in 1990. This review presents also application of electrodiffusiophoresis for making bactericidal coatings. 

This effect has attracted new attention in 2010 with regard to microfluidics.

See also
Interface and colloid science

References

Colloidal chemistry